TNSP may refer to:

 Transmission Network Service Provider, Australian energy provider
 Truman National Security Project, Washington, D.C. institute
 TetraNode Streaming Protocol, used in some TETRA implementations